Myohyangsan SC is an association football club from North Korea. 5,000 capacity Myohyangsan Stadium is their home stadium. They play in the DPR Korea League, the topflight league of DPR Korea.

Football clubs in North Korea